Éamon Gerard Phoenix (1953 – 13 November 2022)  was one of Northern Ireland’s leading social and political historians specialising in the history of the North-East part of the island. He was a regular broadcaster with BBC Northern Ireland and a prolific contributor to Irish News.

Biography
Éamon Phoenix attended St Mary's Christian Brothers' Grammar School, Belfast and subsequently Queen’s University Belfast.  He was awarded a B.A. (Hons) in History followed by a Ph.D. in 1983. The topic of his PhD thesis was Irish nationalism.

He taught history at St Malachy's College and worked as a Fellow at the institute of Irish Studies at Queen's University Belfast before taking up a permanent appointment at Stranmillis University College.

He published extensively on aspects of Irish history and regularly gave public lectures on the subject. He wrote articles on aspects of Irish history for newspapers and for online publications including the BBC.

Public Life
Phoenix held a variety of positions. He was Chairperson of the Edmund Rice Schools Trust Northern Ireland. He was a member of the Expert Advisory Group established by the Irish government to advise it on matters related to the Decade of Centenaries.

He also organised a lecture series for the Northern Ireland Community Relations Council. He was a member of the National Famine Committee and the Nomadic Project Board. He was a Trustee of the Ulster Historical Foundation.

Bibliography
 Phoenix, E.G., McAuley, E., & McSparran, N. (2021). Feis na nGleann: A Century of Gaelic Culture in the Antrim Glens. Belfast: Ulster Historical Foundation.
 Phoenix, E.G. (2000). Two Acres of Irish History: Study Through Time of Friar's Bush and Belfast, 1570–1918. Belfast: Ulster Historical Foundation.
 Phoenix, E.G. (1995). A Century of Northern Life: Irish News and 100 Years of Ulster History, 1890s-1990s. Belfast: Ulster Historical Foundation.
 Phoenix, E.G. (1994). Northern Nationalism: Nationalist Politics, Partition and the Catholic Minority in Northern Ireland, 1890–1940. Belfast: Ulster Historical Foundation.

Awards
 2022 - Good Relations Award from the Community Relations Council

References

1953 births
2022 deaths
People educated at St. Mary's Christian Brothers' Grammar School, Belfast
Alumni of Queen's University Belfast
20th-century Irish historians
21st-century Irish historians